Vexillum varicosum is a species of small sea snail, marine gastropod mollusk in the family Costellariidae, the ribbed miters.

Description

Distribution

References

 Turner H. (2008) New species of the family Costellariidae from the Indian and Pacific Oceans (Gastropoda: Neogastropoda: Muricoidea). Archiv für Molluskenkunde 137(1): 105–125. [27 June 2008] page(s): 109

varicosum
Gastropods described in 2008